Below is a list of notable real estate investment firms.

Largest private real estate investment firms by capital raised 
Each year Private Equity Real Estate publishes ranking of the largest private real estate investment firms by how much capital they have raised for real estate investments in the last five years:

Notable private real estate investment firms

Americas 

 AEW Capital Management
 Angelo Gordon
 Apollo Global Management
 Ares Management
 Bain Capital
 Barings LLC
 Beacon Capital Partners
 BentallGreenOak
 Blackstone Inc.
 Brookfield Asset Management
 CBRE Investment Management
 Centerbridge Partners
 Cerberus Capital Management
 CIM Group
 Clarion Partners
 Cohen & Steers
 Enterprise Community Partners
 Fortress Investment Group
 Greystar Real Estate Partners
 Harbert Management Corporation
 HIG Realty Partners
 Hines
 JRK Property Holdings
 Kennedy Wilson
 KKR
 LaSalle Investment Management
 Lone Star Funds
 MCR Hotels
 Nuveen Real Estate
 Oak Street Capital
 Oaktree Capital Management
 PineBridge Benson Elliot
 Pretium Partners
 Rockpoint Group
 Sculptor Capital Management
 Southwest Value Partners
 Starwood Capital Group
 StepStone Group
 Stockbridge Capital Group
 The Carlyle Group
 Tishman Speyer
 TPG
 Tricon Residential
 Walton Street Capital
 Warburg Pincus

Asia 

 BPEA EQT
 CapitaLand
 Charter Hall
 ESR Group
 Gaw Capital
 GLP
 Hony Capital
 IGIS Asset Management
 Keppel Capital
 Lendlease
 PAG
 Phoenix Property Investors
 Queensland Investment Corporation
 Sino-Ocean Capital

EMEA 

 Ardian
 BC Partners
 BMO Real Estate Partners
 Bouwfonds
 CapMan
 EQT Exeter
 Europa Capital
 Kildare Partners
 MARK Capital Management
 Partners Group
 Patrizia SE

Notable real estate investment trusts

Americas 

 Aimco
 Alexander's
 Alexandria Real Estate Equities
 American Campus Communities
 American Homes 4 Rent
 American Tower
 Americold
 Annaly Capital Management
 Arlington Asset Investment
 AvalonBay Communities
 Boston Properties
 Brandywine Realty Trust
 Boardwalk Real Estate Investment Trust
 Brookfield Property Partners
 Brixmor Property Group
 Camden Property Trust
 CAPREIT
 CBL Properties
 Cedar Realty Trust
 Chartwell Retirement Residences
 Choice Properties REIT
 Cominar REIT
 CoreCivic
 Corporate Office Properties Trust
 Cousins Properties
 Crombie REIT
 Crown Castle
 CubeSmart
 Digital Realty
 Dream Industrial REIT
 Dream Office REIT
 EPR Properties
 Equinix
 Equity Residential
 Essex Property Trust
 Extended Stay America
 Extra Space Storage
 Federal Realty Investment Trust
 First Capital REIT
 Gaming and Leisure Properties
 GEO Group
 Granite Real Estate
 H&R REIT
 Healthpeak Properties
 Hersha Hospitality Trust
 Host Hotels & Resorts
 Hudson Pacific Properties
 InnSuites Hospitality
 InterRent REIT
 InvenTrust Properties
 Invitation Homes
 Iron Mountain
 JBG Smith
 Kimco Realty
 Lamar Advertising Company
 Life Storage
 Macerich
 Medical Properties Trust
 MGM Growth Properties
 Mid-America Apartment Communities
 Minto Apartment REIT
 Morguard REIT
 National Retail Properties
 Outfront Media
 Park Hotels & Resorts
 Pennsylvania Real Estate Investment Trust
 PotlatchDeltic
 Prologis
 PS Business Parks
 Public Storage
 Quality Technology Services
 Rayonier
 Realty Income
 Regency Centers
 RioCan REIT
 RPT Realty
 SBA Communications
 Simon Property Group
 SITE Centers
 SL Green Realty
 Store Capital
 Sun Communities
 Tanger Factory Outlet Centers
 UDR
 UMH Properties
 Urstadt Biddle Properties
 Ventas
 Veris Residential
 Vici Properties
 Vornado Realty Trust
 W. P. Carey
 Washington Prime Group
 Welltower
 Weyerhaeuser
 Xenia Hotels & Resorts

Asia 

 Champion REIT
 Dexus
 Goodman Group
 GPT Group
 Hui Xian REIT
 Link REIT
 Stockland
 Vicinity Centres

EMEA 

 Apache Capital Partners
 Big Yellow Group
 British Land
 Briston
 Cofinimmo
 Derwent London
 Great Portland Estates
 Hammerson
 Hansteen Holdings
 Intu
 Irish Residential Properties REIT
 Landsec
 LondonMetric Property
 NewRiver
 Primary Health Properties
 Safestore
 Shaftesbury
 Soho Estates
 Segro
 Unite Students
 Workspace Group

See also 
 List of asset management firms
 List of private-equity firms
 Private equity real estate
 Real estate investment trust

References

Real estate companies
Real estate investing
Real estate investment trusts